Erpobdella lahontana is an leech in the Erpobdellidae family.

References

Leeches
Animals described in 2000